The Daihatsu Midget is a single-seater mini-truck, later a microvan/kei truck made by Japanese automaker Daihatsu. Several distinct vehicles have borne the Midget name over the years, but all have had in common a single or two-seat utilitarian design, with an enclosed or semi-enclosed cab. Its appearance is very similar to the Cushman Truckster  introduced in 1952.

First generation (DK/DS/MP; 1957–1972)

DK/DS series 

In August 1957 the original DKA Midget was introduced. It featured three wheels, a single seat, a doorless cab, and handlebar steering. The engine was an air-cooled two-stroke single-cylinder design of 250 cc (ZA) which produced . Beginning in August 1959 it was replaced by the more comfortable DSA, which has doors and a more powerful  version of the ZA engine.

There was also a rare two-seat version (DSAP), with the passenger seat offset to the left behind the driver. This required a longer passenger compartment, which encroached on the cargo area. There was also the DSV, a panel van version.

MP series 
In October 1959 the MP2 Midget was introduced in Japan - updated with such features as a steering wheel, doors, and seating for two. This model had already been sold in the United States since April 1959, as the MPA, although it was marketed as the "Daihatsu Trimobile". Companies such as Boeing and Lockheed used these little vehicles inside of their plants, for instance. The engine was the same (ZA) air-cooled two-stroke one-cylinder design with  but an extra  made for a sluggish vehicle. The DSA continued to be built alongside the more expensive MP variants into the early sixties. There was again a panel van version also available.

Subsequent revisions to the MP design were soon made, resulting in the model MP3 which has the larger ZD engine of 305 cc which produced . In May 1960 the  longer MP4 arrived, featuring roll-up door windows. In August 1961 the doors were modified, now incorporating a triangular vent window and a chromed side strip. In September 1962 the final iteration, the MP5, arrived. As a matter of fact, nearly all body panels were altered in some way, with new marker lights installed, redesigned doors, a  blunter and more rounded front, bigger vent openings in front of the doors' leading edge, and finally a solid metal roof rather than the earlier fabric-covered opening. The MP5 also gained more chrome trim, around the headlamps and elsewhere. April 1963 saw the introduction of automatic oil mixing for the two-stroke engine. In August 1969 new safety regulations required certain lighting changes, a driver's side headrest, and seatbelts. The MP5 remained in production until December 1971, and on sale into 1972.

By 1972, after 336,534 units had been produced, production was terminated because of the falling popularity of three-wheeled models in favor of more modern four-wheeled models.

The Midget I has also been sold outside Japan as the "Bajaj", "Tri-Mobile", or "Bemo" (Bemos in Indonesia are used as autorickshaw share taxis). It is one of the first cars manufactured by the Japanese automaker Daihatsu, known for its low cost, practical vehicles. Thai production began in 1959, with Indonesia, Pakistan, and many other countries soon following. Almost exclusively used as an autorickshaw (or 'tuk-tuk') the Midget was also a well known icon of public transportation in South Asia. Not meant for performance, this narrow vehicle does weave through larger traffic well, despite the fact that it only has three wheels. These original tuk-tuks are a little harder to find in modern times.

In Thailand the Midget MP4 is still in production as a Chinnaraje Midget in Chiang Mai and as a TukTuk Midget MP4 in Bangkok. The facelifted version, known as MP5 is also still manufactured by the TukTuk (Thailand) Co., Ltd. in Bangkok.

Second generation (K100; 1996–2001) 

From 1996 to 2001, Daihatsu manufactured a four-wheeled kei Midget with four-wheel drive as well as air conditioning as options.  As Kei cars, they were equipped with 660 cc engines.

The Midget II was introduced as a concept at the 1993 Tokyo Motor Show. There are two types of engine available, differentiated by the injection type, one being electronic. Both are identical in width and height, but the EFI (Electronic Fuel Injection) version is shorter by 75mm. They are available in a one-seater or two-seater configuration, with automatic and manual transmissions available. The Midget is often used by owners of bars in Japan, as they are a perfect size to haul around kegs. The design of the Midget is somewhat unusual with the spare tire mounted on the front.

References

Daihatsu Midget DKA and MP5 at the Toyota Automobile Museum website

External links

Midget
Kei cars
Kei trucks
Microvans
Three-wheeled motor vehicles
Rear mid-engine, rear-wheel-drive vehicles